John Salvatore Ruggiero (born 26 November 1954) is an English former footballer who played in the Football League for Brighton & Hove Albion, Chester, Portsmouth and Stoke City.

Career
Ruggiero was born in Stoke-on-Trent to Italian parents and joined Stoke City when he was 16 in 1974, he went out on loan to Workington and Cape Town City. He was given a run in the first team towards the end of the 1976–77 season with the team struggling at the bottom of the First Division having had to sell their star players due to the Butler Street stand having to be rebuilt. Ruggiero scored twice against Coventry City but Stoke failed to avoid relegation and Ruggiero joined Brighton & Hove Albion. He then spent time with Portsmouth, Chester and Telford United.

Career statistics
Source:

References

External links
 John Ruggiero interview at svenskafans.com

1954 births
Living people
Footballers from Stoke-on-Trent
English people of Italian descent
Association football forwards
English footballers
Stoke City F.C. players
Workington A.F.C. players
Cape Town City F.C. (NFL) players
Brighton & Hove Albion F.C. players
Portsmouth F.C. players
Chester City F.C. players
Telford United F.C. players
English Football League players
National Football League (South Africa) players